is a Japanese professional wrestler and mixed martial artist. He competed in the Light Heavyweight division.

Mixed martial arts record

|-
| Loss
| align=center| 1-14
| Yusaku Inoue
| TKO (punches)
| GCM: Cage Force 16
| 
| align=center| 1
| align=center| 2:48
| Tokyo, Japan
| 
|-
| Loss
| align=center| 1-13
| Ikkei Nagamura
| TKO (punches)
| GCM: Cage Force & Valkyrie
| 
| align=center| 1
| align=center| 0:37
| Tokyo, Japan
| 
|-
| Loss
| align=center| 1-12
| Shuji Morikawa
| TKO (punches)
| GCM: Cage Force 9
| 
| align=center| 2
| align=center| 0:37
| Tokyo, Japan
| 
|-
| Loss
| align=center| 1-11
| Keitaro Maeda
| Decision (unanimous)
| GCM: Cage Force 6
| 
| align=center| 3
| align=center| 3:00
| Tokyo, Japan
| 
|-
| Win
| align=center| 1-10
| Yuta Nakamura
| Submission (achilles lock)
| GCM: Demolition West in Yamaguchi
| 
| align=center| 1
| align=center| 1:56
| Hikari, Yamaguchi, Japan
| 
|-
| Loss
| align=center| 0-10
| Ryan Bigler
| Submission (rear-naked choke)
| Geran Haga: Blood Wars 2
| 
| align=center| 1
| align=center| 0:00
| Hagåtña, Guam
| 
|-
| Loss
| align=center| 0-9
| Masahiro Toryu
| KO (punch)
| Pancrase: Blow 11
| 
| align=center| 1
| align=center| 1:16
| Tokyo, Japan
| 
|-
| Loss
| align=center| 0-8
| Kazuhiro Hanada
| TKO (cut)
| GCM: Demolition 030629
| 
| align=center| 1
| align=center| 2:53
| Tokyo, Japan
| 
|-
| Loss
| align=center| 0-7
| Daisuke Nakamura
| Submission (armbar)
| GCM: Demolition 030126
| 
| align=center| 1
| align=center| 2:06
| Tokyo, Japan
| 
|-
| Loss
| align=center| 0-6
| Yuji Hisamatsu
| Decision (40-35)
| GCM: ORG 2nd
| 
| align=center| 2
| align=center| 5:00
| Tokyo, Japan
| 
|-
| Loss
| align=center| 0-5
| Daisuke Watanabe
| TKO (punches)
| Pancrase: Proof 5
| 
| align=center| 2
| align=center| 0:17
| Tokyo, Japan
| 
|-
| Loss
| align=center| 0-4
| Izuru Takeuchi
| Decision (unanimous)
| Shooto: Gig '99
| 
| align=center| 2
| align=center| 5:00
| Tokyo, Japan
| 
|-
| Loss
| align=center| 0-3
| Ryuta Sakurai
| TKO (cut)
| Shooto: Shooter's Soul
| 
| align=center| 1
| align=center| 0:54
| Setagaya, Tokyo, Japan
| 
|-
| Loss
| align=center| 0-2
| Yuki Sasaki
| Decision (unanimous)
| Shooto: Shooter's Dream
| 
| align=center| 2
| align=center| 5:00
| Setagaya, Tokyo, Japan
| 
|-
| Loss
| align=center| 0-1
| Michael Pacholik
| TKO (submission to punches)
| WVC 3: World Vale Tudo Championship 3
| 
| align=center| 1
| align=center| 1:25
| São Paulo, Brazil
|

See also
List of male mixed martial artists

References

1971 births
Japanese male mixed martial artists
Japanese male professional wrestlers
Light heavyweight mixed martial artists
Mixed martial artists utilizing judo
Mixed martial artists utilizing wrestling
Mixed martial artists utilizing kickboxing
Living people